Sergey Omelchenko (born 16 February 1953) is a Soviet skier. He competed in the Nordic combined event at the 1980 Winter Olympics.

References

External links
 

1953 births
Living people
Soviet male Nordic combined skiers
Olympic Nordic combined skiers of the Soviet Union
Nordic combined skiers at the 1980 Winter Olympics
Place of birth missing (living people)